Porgy and Bess (CL 1274) is a studio album by jazz musician Miles Davis, released in March 1959 on Columbia Records. The album features arrangements by Davis and collaborator Gil Evans from George Gershwin's 1935 opera of the same name. The album was recorded in four sessions on July 22, July 29, August 4, and August 18, 1958, at Columbia's 30th Street Studio in New York City. It is the second collaboration between Davis and Evans and has garnered much critical acclaim since its release, being acknowledged by some music critics as the best of their collaborations. Jazz critics have regarded the album as historically important.

Background

Conception
In 1958, Davis was one of many jazz musicians growing dissatisfied with bebop, seeing its increasingly complex chord changes as hindering creativity. Five years earlier, in 1953, pianist George Russell published his Lydian Chromatic Concept of Tonal Organization, which offered an alternative to the practice of improvisation based on chords. Abandoning the traditional major and minor key relationships of classical music, Russell developed a new formulation using scales or a series of scales for improvisations. His approach to improvisation came to be known as modal in jazz. Davis saw Russell's methods of composition as a means of getting away from the dense chord-laden compositions of his time, which Davis had labeled "thick". Modal composition, with its reliance on scales and modes, represented, as Davis put it, "a return to melody". In a 1958 interview with Nat Hentoff of The Jazz Review, Davis remarked on the modal approach:

In early 1958, Davis began using this approach with his sextet. Influenced by Russell's ideas, Davis implemented his first modal composition with the title track of his 1958 album Milestones, which was based on two modes, recorded in April of that year. Instead of soloing in the straight, conventional, melodic way, Davis’s new style of improvisation featured rapid mode and scale changes played against sparse chord changes. Davis' second collaboration with Gil Evans on Porgy and Bess gave him more room for experimentation with Russell's concept and with third stream playing, as Evans' compositions for Davis featured this modal approach.

Adaptation
The musical, commercial and critical success of 1957's Miles Ahead helped make future Davis/Evans ventures possible, as it impressed Columbia Records enough for them to bestow further artistic control upon Davis and Evans. At that period, Davis' girlfriend Frances Taylor was in the New York City Center's production of the George Gershwin/DuBose Heyward/Ira Gershwin opera Porgy and Bess, and the Samuel Goldwyn film adaptation was in production, set for release in June 1959. The advance publicity for the film was considerable, and with the late-1950s vogue for recorded "jazz versions of...", a number of Porgy and Bess jazz interpretations were released. These ranged from an all-star big band version arranged and conducted by Bill Potts to one by Bob Crosby and the Bobcats. Following the first collaboration with Evans, Davis followed up on these efforts with much interest in symphonic readings, which, at the time, jazzmen were not known for, and neither were some classically trained musicians known for interpreting jazz scores. Nevertheless, Davis enlisted members of his sextet, including Cannonball Adderley and Paul Chambers.

Reception and influence

The second in a series of Davis/Evans collaborations, Porgy and Bess was well received upon its release by music critics and publications, including The New York Times and Los Angeles Times. Music writer Bill Kirchner wrote "In this century's American music, three partnerships have been most influential: Duke Ellington/Billy Strayhorn, Frank Sinatra/Nelson Riddle, and Miles Davis/Gil Evans." As one of Davis' best-selling albums, Porgy and Bess has earned recognition as a landmark album in orchestral jazz. Davis biographer Jack Chambers described the album as "a new score, with its own integrity, order and action." 

The album's appeal was more widespread among critics following its reissue in 1997. Robert Gilbert of All About Jazz praised Porgy and Bess, describing it as "one of many great albums that Miles Davis recorded over his lifetime. It reaches a higher plateau than most, though, in its way that it can reach the listener on both a musical and emotional level. That the album is still able to do this after almost forty-five years is a testament to the rare magic that occurred in a New York studio over four days in the summer of 1958."

In August 1997, JazzTimes magazine called Porgy and Bess "possibly the best of the collaborations between Miles and Gil Evans ... Evans is justly regarded as the master of modern orchestration and Porgy and Bess shows him at his best." The album was included in Elvis Costello's "500 Albums You Need" (Vanity Fair, Issue No. 483 11/00) and was ranked No. 785 on the Virgin "All-Time Top 1000 Album" list.

Track listing
All compositions written by George Gershwin, except otherwise noted. (Although Ira Gershwin and DuBose Heyward wrote lyrics to the opera Porgy and Bess, these recordings are instrumental.)

Side one

Side two

Bonus tracks
Bonus cuts featured on the 1997 compact disc reissue.

Personnel

Musicians
Miles Davis – trumpet, flugelhorn
Ernie Royal, Bernie Glow, Johnny Coles and Louis Mucci – trumpet
Dick Hixon, Frank Rehak, Jimmy Cleveland and Joe Bennett – trombone
Willie Ruff, Julius Watkins and Gunther Schuller – horn
Bill Barber – tuba
Phil Bodner, Jerome Richardson and Romeo Penque – flute, alto flute, clarinet
Cannonball Adderley – alto saxophone
Danny Bank – alto flute, bass flute, bass clarinet
Paul Chambers – bass
Philly Joe Jones – drums (except tracks 2, 8, 10 & 11)
Jimmy Cobb – drums (tracks 2, 8, 10 & 11)
Gil Evans – arranger, conductor

Production
Cal Lampley – production
Frank Laico – recording engineering
Roy DeCarava – cover photography

Certifications and sales

References

Bibliography 
 "The Golden Anniversary of Miles Davis's 'Porgy & Bess'" by Alan Kurtz et al., (Jazz.com)

External links
 Porgy and Bess at Discogs
 Accolades: Porgy and Bess at Acclaimed Music

1959 albums
Albums arranged by Gil Evans
Albums conducted by Gil Evans
Albums produced by Cal Lampley
Albums recorded at CBS 30th Street Studio
Columbia Records albums
Grammy Hall of Fame Award recipients
Miles Davis albums
Miles Davis album
Instrumental albums